Monica F. Helms (born 8 March 1951) is an American  transgender activist, author, and veteran of the United States Navy. She is the creator of the transgender flag.

Education 
Helms received a General AA Degree and an AA in Industrial Television from Glendale Community College in Arizona in 1987 and graduated from Chattahoochee Technical College in 2018 with an AA Degree in Television Production Technology.

US Navy career 

During her time in the Navy, Helms began dressing as a woman while based in Charleston, South Carolina and says in an interview it was the "deepest, darkest secret in [her] entire life". She was reassigned to the San Francisco area in 1976, and said she "felt like [she] could be out in public as [herself]".

Helms left the Navy in 1978, and joined her hometown's chapter of the United States Submarine Veterans, Inc. in 1996. After transitioning, Helms reapplied in 1998 to the Phoenix chapter of the veteran's group with the name "Monica" and received considerable push-back, including being referred to a more generic veteran's group for women rather than the submarine specific group. Helms eventually prevailed after a few months and is the first woman to ever join the organization.

Activism 
Helms created the Transgender Pride Flag in 1999, and it was first flown at a Pride Parade in Phoenix, Arizona in 2000. Helms donated the original Transgender Pride Flag at the first ceremony honoring the addition of a collection of LGBT historical items at the Smithsonian on August 19, 2014.

Helms founded the Transgender American Veterans Association (TAVA) in 2003, and remained president until 2013. On May 1, 2004, TAVA sponsored the first ever Transgender Veterans March to the Wall.  Fifty trans veterans arrived in DC and visited the Vietnam Memorial to honor people they knew whose names are on The Wall.  They also made history when they became the first openly transgender people to lay a wreath at the Tomb of the Unknowns. They did it again in 2005. Helms continues to advocate for transgender service members and veterans, as the end of the prolific Don't Ask Don't Tell policy of the United States military did not change the status of transgender military personnel.She was elected as a delegate to the 2004 Democratic National Convention in Boston, Massachusetts. She was the first trans person elected to a DNC Convention from Georgia.

In June 2019, to mark the 50th anniversary of the Stonewall riots, an event widely considered a watershed moment in the modern LGBTQ rights movement, Queerty named her one of the Pride50 for "trailblazing individuals who actively ensure society remains moving towards equality, acceptance and dignity for all queer people".

References

1951 births
Activists from Arizona
Activists from South Carolina
American LGBT military personnel
Female United States Navy personnel
Flag designers
LGBT people from Arizona
LGBT people from South Carolina
American LGBT rights activists
Living people
People from Sumter, South Carolina
Transgender military personnel
Transgender women
Transgender writers